Greg Kroah-Hartman (GKH) is a major Linux kernel developer.  he is the Linux kernel maintainer for the  branch, the staging subsystem, USB, driver core, debugfs, kref, kobject, and the sysfs kernel subsystems, Userspace I/O (with Hans J. Koch), and TTY layer. He also created linux-hotplug, the udev project, and the Linux Driver Project. He worked for Novell in the SUSE Labs division and, works at the Linux Foundation.

Biography
Kroah-Hartman is a co-author of Linux Device Drivers (3rd Edition) and author of Linux Kernel in a Nutshell, and used to be a contributing editor for Linux Journal. He also contributes articles to LWN.net, the Linux news site.

Kroah-Hartman frequently helps in the documentation of the kernel and driver development through talks and tutorials. In 2006, he released a CD image of material to introduce a programmer to working on Linux device driver development.

He also initiated the development of openSUSE Tumbleweed, the rolling release model edition of openSUSE.

In April 2021, Kroah-Hartman announced the decision to ban the University of Minnesota from contributing to the Linux kernel and to revert all prior patches from the university after researchers intentionally inserted bugs in an unauthorised penetration test.

Books

References

External links 

 Greg Kroah-Hartman's blog
 Greg Kroah-Hartman's Linux page
 List of articles written by Greg Kroah-Hartman in Linux Journal
 List of articles written by Greg Kroah-Hartman in LWN
 Greg Kroah-Hartman's HOWTO article on Linux kernel development
 Linux Driver Project
 Video with Greg Kroah-Hartman at Hannover Industry Trade Fair, Germany, May 2008
 Greg Kroah-Hartman Linux Plumbers Keynote (video)

Linux kernel programmers
Living people
Year of birth missing (living people)
SUSE Linux
Novell people
Gentoo Linux people